Tarun Mansukhani is a Bollywood director and writer.  His most popular film to date would be Dostana produced by Karan Johar starring Abhishek Bachchan, John Abraham and Priyanka Chopra.
Born into a Sindhi family, he was educated at the Lawrence School, Sanawar.
Beyond the world of film, Mansukhan directed a television commercial entitled "Lead India" to promote voting at the national elections.  This was produced by Dharma Productions. He has also acted in the famous family sitcom Dekh Bhai Dekh.

Filmography 

 
As Assistant Director

References

External links 
 

Year of birth missing (living people)
Living people
Sindhi people
Lawrence School, Sanawar alumni
Hindi-language film directors
21st-century Indian film directors